Hadji Bey is a Turkish delight confectionery that was originally produced in Cork and has since moved to a production site in County Kildare, Ireland with Urney Chocolates.

History
The original product was created by Harutun and Esther Batmazian, an Armenian trader and his wife, who arrived in Cork in 1902 after fleeing pogroms in the Ottoman Empire. They exhibited his confections at the Great Cork International Exhibition that year. The business was set up in Cork City where it thrived, although after WWI there was an incident with the premises being burned. It is assumed this occurred when soldiers returning from the Gallipoli offensive mistook the family for Turks. Batmazian moved the shop from Lower Glanmire Street to McCurtain Street and set about explaining the family heritage to the local people. The sweet became a regional favourite. The business exported its confections to Harrods in London and Bloomingdale's in New York. It was even supplied to Buckingham Palace.

His shop facade on McCurtin Street read: Hadji Bey et Cie which gave the premises an exotic, international, quasi-French atmosphere.

Today
Esther died in the 1940s and her husband left Cork and moved to the United States. Their son Eddie Batmazian ran the business until he retired in 1970, after which the business began to decline. By 2010 the product was bought and made by UHC Confectionery in Newbridge, while keeping a premises at the English Market in Cork.

Notes

External links
Official website

1902 establishments in Ireland
Brand name snack foods
Food and drink companies of Ireland
Food companies of the Republic of Ireland
History of Ireland (1801–1923)
Irish confectionery
Newbridge, County Kildare